Doctor Who and the Pirates, or The Lass That Lost a Sailor, is a Big Finish Productions audio drama based on the long-running British science fiction television series Doctor Who. It is the first musical story in the series' history.

Plot
The Sixth Doctor and Evelyn confront the feared pirate captain Red Jasper, and the Doctor sings "I am the very model of a Gallifreyan buccaneer" and other Gilbert and Sullivan songs. A reviewer for Metro wrote, "He has a marvellous singing voice."

Cast
The Doctor — Colin Baker
Evelyn Smythe — Maggie Stables
Jem — Dan Barratt
Sally — Helen Goldwyn
Red Jasper — Bill Oddie
Swan — Nicholas Pegg
Merryweather — Mark Siney
Mate/Sailor/Pirate — Timothy Sutton

Music
The songs use substituted lyrics to tunes from various Gilbert and Sullivan operas. These include: "I am the very model of a Gallifreyan buccaneer" a pastiche on the "Major-General's Song", "An assassin's lot is not a happy one", based on the "A Policeman's Lot Is Not a happy one", both from The Pirates of Penzance, and "I'm Jasper's man", to the tune of "I am so proud" from The Mikado. Music from more of the Savoy operas is used elsewhere in it, such as one of the pirates humming "Rising Early in the Morning" from The Gondoliers.

References

External links
Doctor Who and the Pirates, Big Finish Productions

2003 audio plays
Sixth Doctor audio plays
Adaptations of works by Gilbert and Sullivan
Fiction with unreliable narrators
Fiction set in the 18th century